Parkol Marine Engineering is a shipbuilding and engineering company based in Whitby, North Yorkshire, England. The company was founded in 1971 and, since 1997, has built an average of two ships per year: orders increased, however, between 2015 and 2018, which led to the company opening a second site on Teesside.

History

Originally formed in 1971, during the 1970s and 1980s the business was a marine repair yard which employed 40 people. Prior to Parkol Marine Engineering (PME) constructing boats in 1997, the last recorded boat to be built in Whitby was in the early 1970s. The Parkol company was formed by Ken Parker and John Oliver, with the new venture being a portmanteau of the first parts of their surnames. In 1997, after acquiring a dry dock from the Netherlands, Parkol Marine Engineering ventured into the boat-building business, launching a  scalloper in 1997, though the first trawler they built was the Rebecca in 1999. Originally located at Spital Bridge in the town, they moved to a new site closer to the riverside on Church Street.

 In their Church Street site, the company have a fabrication, shot blasting and painting hall. Every newbuild boat at Parkol Marine has been created on paper by the ship designer Ian Paton.

The larger site was created so that Parkol could build bigger boats and tailor bespoke boat building to the fishing industry's needs. Combined with the site on Teesside, the company employed 80 tradesmen and staff, dropping to around 70 in 2020.

In October 2018, the first boat to be built in the new Middlesbrough site was launched officially at Whitby Harbour. The company offers a range of marine engineering services; from refurbishment and repair, to a whole newbuild ship. The yard offers ship-lengthening services.

Parkol also undertake maintenance, and have, in the past, cleaned the Whitby Lifeboat and serviced her in less than six hours so as to keep the lifeboat availability at the best it could be. In 2002, they built a replica of Captain Cook's ship, HMS Bark Endeavour, to two-fifths of the actual size. The replica vessel (known simply as either Endeavour or The Bark Endeavour Whitby) sails up and down the coast from Whitby and is powered by a motor. The ship was constructed from wood using the skills of local tradesmen.

Parkol regularly feature in the Fishing Vessel of the Year competitions run by Fishing News: they won best vessel in 2015 and 2016. Their yard in Whitby has been featured in an episode of Kavanagh QC on ITV in 1998.

Parkol fabricate their boats on the quayside and then have a crane lift their vessels into the water, as opposed to the normal route of launching them down the slipway.

Ships built
Below is a sample list of ships that Parkol Marine have built since 1997. There is not a ship with yard number 13.

See also
List of shipbuilders in the United Kingdom

References

Engineering companies of England
Shipbuilding companies of England
1971 establishments in England
Companies based in the Borough of Scarborough
Manufacturing companies established in 1971
British companies established in 1971
Whitby